Henri Massal (1 May 1921 – 11 August 2009) was a French professional road bicycle racer. Massal was the first winner of the GP du Midi Libre. He also won one stage in the 1947 Tour de France.

Major results

1947
Tour de France:
Winner stage 12
1949
Grand Prix du Midi Libre

References

External links 

Official Tour de France results for Henri Massal

French male cyclists
1921 births
2009 deaths
French Tour de France stage winners
Sportspeople from Béziers
Cyclists from Occitania (administrative region)